María Isabel Franco Sánchez (born 1970) is a Spanish journalist and politician, previously of Citizens (Cs), who was that party's candidate for President of the Region of Murcia ahead of the 2019 Murcian regional election as well as Vice President of the Region of Murcia and Regional Minister of Women, Equality, LGTBI, Families and Social Policy since August 2019.

Franco was expelled from Ciudadanos on 13 March 2021 after she and two other deputies from the Ciudadanos group announced that they would join the PP-led regional government and vote against the motion of censure presented by their party on 10 March.

References

Members of the Regional Assembly of Murcia
Citizens (Spanish political party) politicians
Living people
1970 births